The Women's team pursuit race of the 2016 World Single Distances Speed Skating Championships was held on 13 February 2016.

Results
The race was started at 19:30.

References

Women's team pursuit
World